The School of Education and Counseling Psychology at Santa Clara University was created in the fall of 2001 and brought together graduate programs in Counseling Psychology and Education. Approximately 800 graduate students are enrolled in the school, with 200 studying psychology and 400 studying education.

Degrees and Credentials

Education
Master of Arts (MA) (Educational Administration; Higher Education Administration; Interdisciplinary Education; Teaching)
Credential (Single and Multi-subject; Mild and Early Childhood; Administrative Services)

Counseling Psychology
Master of Arts (MA)(Counseling, Counseling Psychology, and Counseling Psychology with California Marriage and Family Therapy (MFT))

Santa Clara University Schools and Colleges
Schools of education in California
Educational institutions established in 2001
2001 establishments in California